The SMART Retainer is a small micro sensor which is imbedded in a traditional orthodontic retainer. The sensor monitors how often the retainer is being worn, and the information is loaded onto the orthodontist's computer via a reader.

Description 

The micro sensor was created to help parents and orthodontists monitor retainer use after braces are removed. The smart retainer chip is about the size of a shirt button and provides detailed information about the chip's environmental surroundings. In the United States a smart retainer sensor is exclusively provided by orthodontists who have signed up to be providers, and should retail for around $100.

The SMART Retainer was featured on the May 15 episode of The Today Show.

Here is an abstract of an article in the American Journal of Orthodontics and Dentofacial Orthopedics:

References 

Smart devices
Orthodontics